"Love on the Rocks" is a song written by Neil Diamond and Gilbert Bécaud that appeared in the 1980 movie The Jazz Singer and  was performed by Diamond on the soundtrack album to the film.  It was also released as a single and reached #2 on the Billboard Hot 100 for three weeks in January 1981. The song also made it to #3 on Billboard's US Adult Contemporary chart.  Billboard rated it as the #26 pop single overall for 1981. It performed less well in the UK, reaching only #17.  It was covered by Millie Jackson on her 1981 album Just a Lil' Bit Country, and by Gladys Knight on the album Great Solo Performances by Guest Artists from the Tom Jones Show, Vol. 1.  Bécaud recorded the song in French as L'Amour est mort on his 1981 eponymous album.

Billboard critic Vicki Pipkin called "Love on the Rocks" a "powerful ballad in true Diamond style."  Billboard also called the song "one of Diamond's more powerful readings" and "a beautiful ballad featuring Diamond's patented smoky vocals.  Record World said it has "enough drama and tension in each line to fill an entire album."  Neil Diamond biographer Laura Jackson describes the lyrics as taking "a sometimes cynical look at a man who is trapped in a relationship and is disillusioned with life." Allmusic critic Johnny Loftus calls it a "lite FM favorite" and "classic, raw-throated Neil."  Author T. Mike Childs rated it as a "terrific" ballad.  Pittsburgh Press music editor Carl Apone claimed that Diamond was at his best in The Jazz Singer in the songs "Hello Again" and "Love on the Rocks."

In the movie, Paul Nicholas does a punk/new wave version of "Love on the Rocks."

Personnel
 Neil Diamond – guitar, lead vocals
 Richard Bennett – acoustic and electric guitars
 Reinie Press – bass
 Dennis St. John – drums
 King Errisson – percussion
 Alan Lindgren – synthesizer, piano, orchestra arrangements and conductor
 Tom Hensley – keyboards

Charts

Weekly charts

Year-end charts

Certifications

Later uses
The Darkness paid tribute to Neil Diamond's "Love on the Rocks" with their own 2003 song "Love on the Rocks with No Ice."

References

Neil Diamond songs
Songs written by Neil Diamond
Song recordings produced by Bob Gaudio
Number-one singles in South Africa
1980 singles
Gladys Knight songs
Paul Nicholas songs
Capitol Records singles
Songs with music by Gilbert Bécaud
1980 songs